Atchison County Community High School is a public secondary school in Effingham, Kansas, United States, serving students in grades 7–12. It is operated by USD 377 school district. The school colors are orange and black. The average annual enrollment is approximately 325 students.

ACCHS is a member of the Kansas State High School Activities Association and offers a variety of sports programs. Athletic teams compete in the 3A division and are known as the "Tigers". Extracurricular activities are also offered in the form of performing arts, school publications, and clubs.

Extracurricular activities
The extracurricular activities offered at Atchison County Community High School are small and fairly limited due to the school's small size. The Tigers are classified as a 3A school, the second-smallest classification in Kansas according to the Kansas State High School Activities Association. Throughout its history, ACCHS has won a few state championships in various sports.

State championships

Sports and activities offered

Fall
 Football
 Volleyball
 Boys' Cross-Country
 Girls' Cross-Country
 Cheerleading
 Dance
 Fall Musical
Winter
 Boys' Basketball
 Girls' Basketball
 Wrestling
 Cheerleading
 Dance
 Scholars' Bowl (Competitive Academic Contest)
 Forensics (Competitive Speech and Drama) 
Spring
 Baseball
 Softball
 Boys' Track and Field
 Girls' Track and Field
 Spring Play
 Forensics (Competitive Speech and Drama)

See also
 List of high schools in Kansas
 List of unified school districts in Kansas

References

External links

 Official Website

Public high schools in Kansas
Schools in Atchison County, Kansas